Kamona is a Bengali drama film directed by Nabendu Sundar. This movie was released on 4 March 1949 in the banner of Kirti Pictures. This is the second film of iconic legendary Bengali actor Uttam Kumar after Drishtidan and debut as the leading person crediting him as Uttam Chatterjee instead of Arun Kumar Chatterjee. Film become huge flop at the box office

Plot

Cast
 Uttam Kumar
 Chhabi Roy
 Tulsi Chakraborty
 Jahar Ganguly
 Jamuna Sinha
 Amar Choudhury
 Rajlakshmi Debi
 Ashu Bose
 Priti Majumdar
 Phani Ray

Soundtrack

References

1949 films
Bengali-language Indian films
1949 drama films
1940s Bengali-language films
Indian drama films
Indian black-and-white films